Company 3 (CO3) is an American post-production company founded in 1997 by colorists Stefan Sonnenfeld and Mike Pethel and visual effects artist/supervisor Noel Castley-Wright. Rob Walston brought the team of artists together and funded Company 3 under 4 Media Company (4MC). Company 3 provides post production, color grading and location services for feature films, commercials, music videos and television.

History
Sonnenfeld, Pethel and Castley-Wright opened Company 3 in Santa Monica, CA in 1997 and launched a New York, NY location in 2002. In 2010, Company 3 New York moved into a new  facility located in Chelsea, Manhattan which houses both Company 3 and its sister visual effects facility, Method Studios. Other offices are located in London, Atlanta, Chicago and Detroit.

In 2000, Company 3, which was then a part of Four Media Company, was acquired by Liberty Media Corporation.  In 2010, Deluxe Entertainment Services Group, Inc. acquired Company 3 along with its sister companies Beast Editorial, Encore, Level 3 Post, Method Studios, RIOT and Rushes.

In November 2020 it was announced that Company 3, along with Method Studios and several of Deluxe's other creative businesses, would be acquired by major visual effects studio, Framestore.

Awards
2014
HPA Award – Outstanding Color Grading (Commercial) - Doosan "Heavy Industries" – Siggy Ferstl

2013
HPA Award – Outstanding Color Grading (Commercial) - Under Armour "Brought To You By Under Armour" – Tom Poole
MVPA Award – Best Colorist/Telecine – Lana Del Rey – “National Anthem” – Dave Hussey 

2012
HPA Award – Outstanding Color Grading (Commercial) - Chrysler "Halftime in America" – Siggy Ferstl
MVPA Award - Best Colorist - Rihanna "We Found Love" - Dave Hussey 
AICE Award – Color Grading - Chrysler "Halftime in America" – Siggy Ferstl 

2011
HPA Award – Outstanding Color Grading (Commercial) - Nissan "Zero" – Siggy Ferstl 
 
2010
HPA Award – Outstanding Color Grading Using a DI Process – Alice in Wonderland – Stefan Sonnenfeld 
HPA Award – Outstanding Color Grading (Commercial) – AT&T "Legends" – Siggy Ferstl

2009
HPA Award – Outstanding Color Grading (Commercial) – Pepsi “Pass” – Stefan Sonnenfeld 
HPA Award – Outstanding Color Grading (Television) – "Yogi’s Bronx" – Siggy Ferstl

2007
HPA Award – Best Color Grading (Feature Film) – 300 – Stefan Sonnenfeld 
HPA Award – Outstanding Color Grading (Commercial) – Nike “Take Over” – Dave Hussey

2006
da Vinci Award – Master Colorist (Feature) – Underworld: Evolution - Siggy Ferstl 
HPA Award – Outstanding Color Correction - ESPN's Arthur Ashe Awards  – “Afghan Women's Soccer” - Siggy Ferstl 

2005
MVPA Award – Best Colorist/Telecine – Modest Mouse – “Ocean Breathes Salty” – Dave Hussey 
da Vinci Award – Master Colorist (Feature) – “Travelers and Musicians” – Siggy Ferstl

2004
MVPA Award – Best Colorist/Telecine – Beyoncé feat. Jay-Z – “Crazy in Love” – Dave Hussey

References

https://www.imdb.com/company/co0028470/

External links

Company 3's Web site
 Deluxe

Entertainment companies established in 1997
Television and film post-production companies
Visual effects companies